William Edward Hadley (11 March 1910 – 30 September 1992) was a New Zealand rugby union player. He played 25 matches for the All Blacks including eight internationals, scoring two Test tries.

Hadley originally played rugby league, playing for the City Rovers club in Auckland from 1928 to 1930 before switching codes in 1931 and joining Marist.

Hadley died in Auckland on 30 September 1992, and his ashes were buried at North Shore Memorial Park.

References

1910 births
1992 deaths
City Rovers players
Rugby union players from Auckland
New Zealand rugby union players
New Zealand international rugby union players
Auckland rugby union players
Rugby union hookers
Burials at North Shore Memorial Park